Yoto is a prefecture located in the Maritime Region of Togo. The prefecture seat is located in Tabligbo.

Canton (administrative divisions) of Yoto include Tabligbo, Kouvé, Gboto, Ahépé, Tokpli, Tchêkpo, Sédomé, Zafi, Kini-Kondji, Amoussimé, Essè-Godjin, and Tométy-Kondji.

References 

Prefectures of Togo
Maritime Region